Qamishlu (also Romanized as Qamīshlū; also known as Mamīshlū, Qameshlū, and Qamshīdī) is a village in Chahardangeh Rural District, Hurand District, Ahar County, East Azerbaijan Province, Iran. At the 2006 census, its population was 490, in 85 families.

References 

Populated places in Ahar County